Theodor Ketterer (1815 - 1884) was a renowned Black forest clockmaker who worked in Furtwangen, (Germany).

Although his cuckoo clocks were not as popular and known as the ones made by the Beha company, they were of the highest quality and made in low numbers.

Both the cases and movements were similar to the Behas; however, there are some differences.

Bibliography 
 Kochmann, Karl (2005): Black Forest Clockmaker and the Cuckoo Clock.

See also 
 Cuckooland Museum
 Johann Baptist Beha
 Emilian Wehrle

19th-century German people
German artisans
German clockmakers
People from Furtwangen im Schwarzwald
1815 births
1884 deaths